The 1993 Minnesota Golden Gophers football team represented the University of Minnesota in the 1993 NCAA Division I-A football season. In their second year under head coach Jim Wacker, the Golden Gophers compiled a 4–7 record and were outscored by their opponents by a combined total of 354 to 253.

Offensive guard Rob Rogers and wide receiver Omar Douglas were named All-Big Ten second team.  Defensive back Justin Conzemius, wide receiver Omar Douglas and linebacker Jeff Rosga were all named second team Academic All-Americans.  Kicker Mike Chalberg, defensive back Justin Conzemius, wide receiver Omar Douglas, offensive lineman Chris Fowlkes, linebacker Peter Hiestand, offensive lineman Todd Jesewitz, linebacker Ben Langford, defensive back Jeff Rosga, linebacker Craig Sauer, tight end Mark Tangen and linebacker Lance Wolkow were named Academic All-Big Ten.

Omar Douglas was awarded the Bronko Nagurski Award, Bruce Smith Award and Butch Nash Award.  Linebacker Andrew Veit was awarded the Carl Eller Award.  Long snapper Scott Williams was awarded the Bobby Bell Award.  Running back Antonio Carter was awarded the Paul Giel Award.

The total home attendance for the season was 239,973, which averaged to 39,995 per game.  The season attendance high was against Wisconsin, with 64,798 in attendance.

Schedule

Game summaries

Purdue

    
    
    
    
    
    
    
    
    
    
    
    
    
    
    
    
    

Scott Eckers 24/36, 402 Yds, 6 TD (school record)
Chris Darkins 30 Rush, 149 Yds, TD 
Omar Douglas 8 Rec, 149 Yds, 5 TD (Big Ten record)

Wisconsin

Roster

References

Minnesota
Minnesota Golden Gophers football seasons
Minnesota Golden Gophers football